Echemus lacertosus is an endemic spider species of the family Gnaphosidae that lives on Príncipe in São Tomé and Príncipe. It was first described in 1907 by Eugène Simon.

Its female holotype measures 8 mm.

References

Endemic fauna of Príncipe
Gnaphosidae
Spiders of Africa
Taxa named by Eugène Simon
Spiders described in 1907